The following lists events that happened during the year 2002 in Bosnia and Herzegovina.

Incumbents
Presidency:
Beriz Belkić (until October 5), Sulejman Tihić (starting October 5)
Jozo Križanović (until October 5), Dragan Čović (starting October 5)
Živko Radišić (until October 5), Mirko Šarović (starting October 5)
Prime Minister: 
 until March 15: Zlatko Lagumdžija
 March 15-December 23: Dragan Mikerević 
 starting December 23: Adnan Terzić

Events

October
 October 6 - 2002 Bosnian general election took place.

 
Years of the 21st century in Bosnia and Herzegovina
2000s in Bosnia and Herzegovina
Bosnia and Herzegovina
Bosnia and Herzegovina